Kovalevsky (feminine Kovalevskaya) is a Russian surname. Notable people with the surname include:
Anton Kavalewski, Belarusian footballer
Alexander Onufrievich Kovalevsky, (1840–1901), Russian embryologist with a medal named for him: the A.O. Kovalevsky Medal; brother of Vladimir Onufryevich Kovalevsky below and thus brother-in-law of Sofia Kovalevskaya below, cousin of Maksim Kovalevsky below
Anton Kovalevski, Ukrainian figure skater
Ekaterina Kovalevskaya, Russian chess player
Maksim Kovalevsky (1851–1916), Russian sociologist, cousin of Vladimir Onufryevich Kovalevsky below and thus cousin-in-law of Sofia Kovalevskaya below and cousin of Alexander Onufrievich Kovalevsky above
Sofia Kovalevskaya (1850-1891), Russian mathematician, wife of Vladimir Onufryevich Kovalevsky below and thus sister-in-law of Alexander Onufrievich Kovalevsky above and cousin-in-law of Maksim Kovalevsky above
Vladimir Antonovich Kovalevsky (born 1927) Ukrainian and German physicist
Vladimir Ivanovich Kovalevsky (1848–1935), Russian statesman
Vladimir Onufryevich Kovalevsky (1842–1883), Russian paleontologist who worked with Charles Darwin; cousin of Maksim Kovalevsky above, brother of Alexander Onufrievich Kovalevsky and husband of Sofia Kovalevskaya above

See also 
 Kowalewski, a Polish surname
 Kovačevski, a Macedonian surname

Russian-language surnames